Santiago Airport  is a rural airport  southeast of San Ignacio de Moxos in the Beni Department of Bolivia.

See also

Transport in Bolivia
List of airports in Bolivia

References

External links 
OpenStreetMap - Santiago
OurAirports - Santiago
Fallingrain - Santiago Airport

Airports in Beni Department